Simon Gareth Burke  (born 8 October 1961) is an Australian actor, active in films, television and theatre.

Biography
Simon Burke began his career at the age of 12, starring in Michael Cove's Kookaburra; a painful look at a dysfunctional working-class family, focusing particularly on an almost autistic young boy. Soon after at the age of 13, Burke starred in Fred Schepisi's acclaimed feature film The Devil's Playground for which he won the AFI Award for Best Actor at the Australian Film Institute Awards. He remains the youngest person ever to be honoured with this award. Since then he has enjoyed great success both in Australia and internationally in film, television, stage, concert appearances and cabaret.

In 2014, Simon starred in Matchbox Pictures/NBC-Universal's highly acclaimed mini-series Devil’s Playground in which he reprised the role of Tom Allen that he created as a 13-year-old. He is the co-creator and executive producer of the project, which this year won both the AACTA and Logie Awards for Most Outstanding Telefeature or Mini-Series.

He has since starred in numerous film, television and theatre productions in Australia and the UK. He starred as Captain Georg von Trapp in The Sound of Music at the London Palladium alongside Connie Fisher and then Summer Strallen. He also played the role of Mr Banks in Mary Poppins in Sydney, Brisbane, Perth and Auckland.

Burke was Federal President of Actors Equity Australia 2004–2014. He is currently a Vice President of the International Federation of Actors (FIA), a global federation of performers' trade unions, guilds and professional associations.

On 10 September 2015, at the Queens Birthday Honours ceremony presided over by the Governor of New South Wales, General David Hurley, Burke was made an Officer of the Order of Australia (AO) with the following citation: "For distinguished service to the performing arts as an actor, singer and producer, and through senior advocacy roles for performers' rights and access to professional development and education programs."

In 2016 he publicly identified himself as being gay.

Filmography

Film

Television

Theatre
1987–88: Les Misérables as Marius (original Australian cast directed by Trevor Nunn)
1989–90: Anything Goes as Billy Crocker (Australia, New Zealand; opposite Geraldine Turner)
1992: The Phantom of the Opera as Raoul (Her Majesty's Theatre, London)
1993: Falsettos as Whizzer (Sydney Opera House)
1994: Nosferatu the Vampire as The Innkeeper (concept cast recording)
1994: Jeffrey as Steve (London premiere)
1996: A Little Night Music as Carl-Magnus, (Royal National Theatre with Dame Judi Dench)
1999–2000: Chicago as Billy Flynn (Sydney/Perth/Brisbane/Singapore/Hong Kong)
2001: Up for Grabs as Gerry – world premiere, (Sydney Opera House)
2004: High Society as CK Dexter Haven
2005–06: Three Furies – Scenes from the Life of Francis Bacon as Francis Bacon, directed by Jim Sharman
2007: Company as Harry
2007: October as Detective Dick (Griffin Theatre Company, Sydney)
2007: The Adventures of Snugglepot and Cuddlepie and Little Ragged Blossom as Mr Lizard, directed by Neil Armfield
2007–08: The Sound of Music as Captain Georg von Trapp
2009: La Cage aux Folles as Georges (Playhouse Theatre, London)
2010: The Sound of Music (2010) as Captain Georg von Trapp (Toronto)
2010: Holding the Man as Dick Conigrave (Trafalgar Studios, London)
2010–12 Mary Poppins as Mr Banks (Sydney, Brisbane, Perth, Auckland)
2014: La Cage aux Folles as Georges (The Production Company)
2017: The Homosexuals, Or Faggots as Warren (Malthouse Theatre)
2017: Noises Off as Lloyd Dallas (Queensland Theatre Company, Melbourne Theatre Company)
2018: Strangers in Between as Peter, Fortyfivedownstairs, Melbourne
2019: Mary Stuart (Kate Mulvany's adaptation) as Amias Paulet (Roslyn Packer Theatre, Sydney Theatre Company)
2020–21: Pippin as Charlemagne, Sydney Lyric Theatre
2021–22: Moulin Rouge! The Musical as Harold Zidler, Regent Theatre, Melbourne, Capitol Theatre, Sydney, winner of Sydney Theatre Award for best performance in a supporting role in a musical, 2022

References

Bibliography
 Holmstrom, John. The Moving Picture Boy: An International Encyclopaedia from 1895 to 1995. Norwich, Michael Russell, 1996, p. 338.

External links

1961 births
Australian male child actors
Australian male film actors
Australian male stage actors
Australian male television actors
Officers of the Order of Australia
Best Actor AACTA Award winners
Australian gay actors
Living people
Place of birth missing (living people)
Australian children's television presenters